The 2011 Belmont Stakes was the 143rd running of the Belmont Stakes and was won by Ruler on Ice. The race was run on June 11, 2011, and was televised in the United States on the NBC television network. The post time was  EDT ( UTC).  As in the previous year, the Belmont (the final jewel in the Triple Crown) was run without the elusive championship at stake as 2011 Kentucky Derby winner Animal Kingdom lost in the Preakness.

Favorite Animal Kingdom lost his footing at the start and could only muster sixth; Ruler On Ice, with jockey Jose Valdivia Jr., sprinted to the finish ahead of Stay Thirsty.

Race
Derby winner Animal Kingdom and Preakness winner Shackleford both competed in the race, which was the first clash at the Belmont between winners of the first two classics since Afleet Alex scored over Giacomo in 2005.

Animal Kingdom attempted to become the 12th horse to complete a Derby-Belmont double, last accomplished by Thunder Gulch in 1995.  Animal Kingdom suffered from a bad start and clipped heels with another horse (not identified by his jockey) and was the last horse for the first quarter of the race, but was able to recover and finished in 6th place. Shackleford finished in 5th place after leading for most of the race before the final stretch.

Other starters were Kentucky Derby second-place finisher Nehro and Mucho Macho Man, 3rd in the Derby and 6th in the Preakness. Other Derby contenders Master of Hounds (5th) and Santiva (6th) also ran.

Field
Kentucky Derby winner Animal Kingdom was installed as the 2–1 early line favorite.
For the first time, the first seven finishers from the Derby ran in the Belmont.

Margins –  length,  lengths
Time – 2:30:88
Track – Sloppy (sealed)

Payout 
The Belmont Stakes Payout Schedule

 $2 Exacta: 3-2 paid    $928.00
 $2 Trifecta: 3-2-5 paid    $8,268.00
 $2 Superfecta: 3-2-5-6 paid    $74,052.00

See also 
 2011 Kentucky Derby
 2011 Preakness Stakes

References 

2011
Belmont Stakes
Belmont Stakes
Belmont Stakes